The 2007 Central Michigan Chippewas football team represented Central Michigan University during the 2007 NCAA Division I FBS football season. Central Michigan competed as a member of the West Division of the Mid-American Conference (MAC). The Chippewas were led by first-year head coach Butch Jones.

Central Michigan finished the regular season with a 7–5 record and a 6–1 record in conference play, placing first in the West Division. They qualified for the MAC Championship Game, where they defeated the Miami RedHawks 35–10. Central Michigan competed in the Motor City Bowl for the second straight year, losing to the Purdue Boilermakers 48–51.

Schedule

Roster

References

Central Michigan
Central Michigan Chippewas football seasons
Mid-American Conference football champion seasons
Central Michigan Chippewas football